Veronica longifolia, known as garden speedwell or longleaf speedwell, is a flowering plant in the family Plantaginaceae.

Description

References

Plants described in 1753
Taxa named by Carl Linnaeus
longifolia